"Vampire Racecourse" is a song by The Sleepy Jackson released as the first single from their debut album Lovers. The song peaked at #71 in Australia and #50 in the UK.

Track listings

Australian CD
 "Vampire Racecourse"
 "Hell Is Here"
 "Revolution"
 "Holly"
 "Mosquito Kids"

UK CD
 "Vampire Racecourse"
 "Hell Is Here"
 "Holly"

UK 7" on red-colored vinyl
 "Vampire Racecourse"
 "Glasshouses"

Charts

References

2003 singles
Songs written by Luke Steele (musician)
2003 songs
EMI Records singles
Capitol Records singles
The Sleepy Jackson songs